John Clayton Unten (運天ジョン・クレイトン, born March 27, 1992 in Ginowan, Okinawa) is a Japanese professional baseball pitcher for the Hokkaido Nippon-Ham Fighters in Japan's Nippon Professional Baseball. He played in one game in 2011.

External links

NPB.com

1992 births
Living people
Baseball people from Okinawa Prefecture
Japanese baseball players
Japanese people of American descent
Nippon Professional Baseball pitchers
Hokkaido Nippon-Ham Fighters players